The Hook of Woodland Heights is a 1990 horror short film written and directed by Michael Savino, and co-written by Mark Veau.

Plot 

Mason Crane, a one-handed man who went on a murderous rampage after committing familicide, is set to be moved from one section of a Woodland Heights psychiatric hospital to another. As soon as Mason's cell is opened, the deranged man crushes an orderly with the door, cuts another's skullcap off with a clipboard, and escapes. Mason makes his way to a wilderness-adjacent home, where he kills a dog, and replaces his missing hand with a bent two-pronged grilling fork. With his new weapon, Mason attacks a group of children playing in a cemetery, stabbing one to death, and scattering the rest.

Mason returns to the woods, where a young couple (Tommy and Katie) have set up at a cottage for some alone time. Nervous due to all the news reports about Mason's escape, Katie convinces Tommy to take her back into town, but the car fails to start. Tommy goes off alone to seek help from a friend named Jimmy who lives nearby, and encounters Mason, who has disemboweled Jimmy. Tommy and Mason fight, with Mason coming out victorious when he stabs Tommy in the crotch. Next, Mason goes after Katie, chasing her through the forest, and into town. Just as Mason is about to kill Katie, he is shot in the head by a bystander.

The film is then revealed to just be a story being told to a group of Cub Scouts. When the storyteller asks the boys if they believe the ghost of Mason Crane still haunts the town, they answer with "No!" The man laughs, turns to the camera (revealing himself to be Mason) and screams, "I do!"

Cast 

 Robert W. Allen as Mason Crane
 Christine McNamara as Katie
 Michael Elyanow as Thomas W. Johnson
 David MacWilliams as Orderly #1
 Keeton Arnett as Orderly #2
 Mark Veau as Orderly #3
 Shauna Dian Wharton as Christopher's Mom
 C. Douglas Frauenholz as Christopher's Dad
 Christopher Demoranville as Christopher
 Justin Ballard as Johnny
 Joel D. Seger as Andy Taylor
 Jeff Densmore as Jimmy Tucker
 John Riley as Patient #1
 Jennifer Cowles as Patient #2
 Toni Ballard as Patient #3
 Cindi Lee McTiernan as Nurse #1
 Maria Savino as Nurse #2
 Fred Groll as Mason Crane's Killer
 Wayne Walker as Police Officer
 Amee Desjoury as Kick the Can Player #1
 Brooke A. Miller as Kick the Can Player #2
 Maura Sullivan as Kick the Can Player #3
 Mark Aylward as Kick the Can Player #4
 Matthew Aylward as Kick the Can Player #5
 Andrea Anjehian as Girl in Neighborhood #1
 Lisa Lemon as Girl in Neighborhood #2
 Vanessa Hero as Girl in Neighborhood #3
 Michelle Rock as Girl in Neighborhood #4
 Michael Gordon as Cub Scout #1
 David Dziemian as Cub Scout #2
 Andrew Weagle as Cub Scout #3
 Rick MacKenzie as WAAF Disc Jockey
 Diane Butler as News Reporter #1
 Steve LeVeille as News Reporter #2

Release 

The Hook of Woodland Heights was released on VHS in 1990, in a double feature with the fifteen-minute short Attack of the Killer Refrigerator. The tape also included a making-of featurette, cast and crew interviews, promotional footage, and footage of a theatrical screening.

Reception 

Critical Condition called the short "fun to watch" and "humorous, gory, and cheesy as hell". eFilm Critic found the film "appealingly goofy" despite the many flaws, and gave it a score of two. Cranked on Cinema wrote "this is a mildly entertaining film" and said that while it was not groundbreaking it was still "impressive as a micro-budget movie". A four out of ten was awarded by Horrorphilia, which concluded "The short running time really saves it. If this was a full-length movie I doubt I could have even made it all the way through".

References

External links 
 

American slasher films
American direct-to-video films
Camcorder films
1990 horror films
1990 films
1990 independent films
1990 direct-to-video films
American independent films
American teen horror films
Films shot in Massachusetts
Scouting in popular culture
Direct-to-video horror films
Films based on urban legends
Films set in psychiatric hospitals
American horror short films
1990s English-language films
1990s American films